is an Echizen Railway Mikuni Awara Line railway station located in the city of Awara, Fukui Prefecture, Japan.

Lines

Station layout
The station consists of one side platform serving a single bi-directional track. There is no station building, but only a shelter on the platform. The station is unstaffed.

Adjacent stations

History
Banden Station was opened on December 30, 1928. On September 1, 1942 the Keifuku Electric Railway merged with Mikuni Awara Electric Railway. Operations were halted from June 25, 2001. The station reopened on August 10, 2003 as an Echizen Railway station.

Surrounding area
Except for one or two homes, the station is surrounded by fields. The center of Awara can be seen in the distance

See also
 List of railway stations in Japan

External links

  

Railway stations in Fukui Prefecture
Railway stations in Japan opened in 1928
Mikuni Awara Line
Awara, Fukui